The Boston Society of Film Critics Award for Best Supporting Actress is one of the annual film awards given by the Boston Society of Film Critics.

Winners

1980s

1990s

2000s

2010s

2020s

References

Boston Society of Film Critics Awards
Film awards for supporting actress